Peadár Gardiner is a former Gaelic footballer who played for Crossmolina Deel Rovers and the Mayo county team.

He had considerable success playing for Crossmolina and Mayo alongside Ciarán McDonald, James Nallen, Stephen Rochford and Michael Moyles. He vice-captained Mayo. He played in the 2006 All-Ireland Senior Football Championship Final.

He played for NUI Galway.

References

Year of birth missing (living people)
Living people
Alumni of the University of Galway
Crossmolina Gaelic footballers
Mayo inter-county Gaelic footballers
University of Galway Gaelic footballers
People from Crossmolina